Xylocopa tenuiscapa, or Xylocopa (Platynopoda) tenuiscapa, is a species of carpenter bee. It is found only in South Asian and Southeast Asian countries.

Like most bees, X. tenuiscapa has a diurnal activity cycle, but in the Western Ghats of Southern India, the species flies in moonlit nights and has been observed as pollinator of nocturnally flowering trees. Males of the species perch on exposed sites close to nests or in the landscape waiting for occasions to mate.

References 

 Animal Diversity Web
 ITIS Report

Further reading 

Ruggiero M. (project leader), Ascher J. et al. (2013). ITIS Bees: World Bee Checklist (version Sep 2009). In: Species 2000 & ITIS Catalogue of Life, 11 March 2013 (Roskov Y., Kunze T., Paglinawan L., Orrell T., Nicolson D., Culham A., Bailly N., Kirk P., Bourgoin T., Baillargeon G., Hernandez F., De Wever A., eds). Digital resource at www.catalogueoflife.org/col/. Species 2000: Reading, UK.
John Ascher, Connal Eardley, Terry Griswold, Gabriel Melo, Andrew Polaszek, Michael Ruggiero, Paul Williams, Ken Walker, and Natapot Warrit.

tenuiscapa
Fauna of South Asia
Fauna of Southeast Asia
Insects described in 1840